Trisha Illana Nayanthara ( If Not Trisha, Then Nayanthara) is a 2015 Indian Tamil language romantic comedy film written and directed by Adhik Ravichandran. The film stars G. V. Prakash Kumar, Manisha Yadav and Anandhi, with VTV Ganesh and Simran portraying supporting roles. The film was dubbed into Telugu as Trisha Leda Nayanthara.

Plot 
While travelling by train, Jeeva (G. V. Prakash Kumar) tells the ticket collector why he left his home and is travelling to Kumbakonam.

Jeeva was born together with two other girls - Aditi (Manisha Yadav) and Ramya (Anandhi) - due to the shortage of private  rooms in the hospital. Jeeva is close to his uncle Vishu (VTV Ganesh) and asks for his advice every time he has problems with girls. The three of them grew up together.

When they are in higher secondary school, Aditi leaves to Bangalore for a week. During this time, Ramya and Jeeva fall in love. Jeeva is afraid about proposing to Ramya, whereas Ramya proposes to Jeeva, and he accepts. That night, Ramya visits Jeeva, and both romance` while roaming around the city. The next day, Jeeva reveals to his friend accidentally about his make out session with Ramya. It starts to spread around the school, and Ramya gets so angry with Jeeva that she dumps him. She leaves Chennai to forget him. As she is leaving, Aditi calls Jeeva and proposes to him on the phone, which Jeeva accepts.

Their relationship is going well for almost three years. One day, Jeeva finds out that Aditi was drinking and forces her into giving up drinking as he hates girls drinking. She promises to stop drinking, but once again, he sees Aditi drinking in a club. He becomes so angry that he scolds her in front of everyone, gets heartbroken, and behaves so wildly that he is forcibly taken away from there. Jeeva tells this story to the ticket collector and finally reaches Kumbakonam, where Vishu was living.

At the railway station, Vishu receives Jeeva. Jeeva asks Vishu for advice, for which he says that if one girl leaves, there is always another one. Jeeva then sees Ramya there and falls for her again. He goes after her, but she chases him off because of what happened in school. There, Vishu tells him to get into contact with Ramya's aunt Simran (Simran). He then tries to make Ramya fall in love again with the help of Simran, doubting whether he can succeed.

Jeeva gets close to Simran, and with her help, he finally woos Ramya again. When they are about to be united, he asks Ramya five questions as he did not know what happened to her these three years when he was not with her. The final question turns out to be whether Ramya is a virgin or not (as Ramya had a breakup recently). Initially, Ramya gets angry by that question but finally confesses that she is not a virgin as she had sex with her ex-boyfriend, Harish (Arya). Upon hearing this, Jeeva gets angry and immediately asks Ramya to call Harish. Harish arrives at the scene and tries to convince Jeeva that they had sex only once, but Jeeva becomes angrier cursing them and leaves immediately. Ramya and Harish unite once again.

Jeeva, feeling disgusted, plans to leave Kumbakonam and go back to Chennai. He tells Vishu that he wants only a virgin girl, but his uncle scolds him by saying that nowadays, virgin girls are really hard to find, but Jeeva sticks with his policy and leaves for the train, which has started moving. He tries to catch the train and sees one hand extended from a train compartment to help him board inside. That is Priya (Priya Anand).

Jeeva thanks Priya and sits beside her in the train, trying to flirt with her by asking about her whereabouts, to which she replies Trichy, and he decides to follow, which implies to the audience that Jeeva is now on a mission to woo Priya. The film ends with him saying "Trisha Illana Nayanthara" (if not Trisha, then Nayanthara).

Cast

Production
The film was first announced in late December 2013, when G. V. Prakash Kumar revealed that he would be working on a film with debutant director Adhik Ravichandran for a "romantic comedy along the lines of Selvaraghavan movies, with Soodhu Kavvum treatment". The project was confirmed in March 2014 with a tentative title of Trisha Illana Nayanthara announced, and veteran director Bharathiraja and actress Sridevi were approached to play supporting roles, though neither subsequently were signed. As the film featured the names of two prominent actresses in the Tamil film industry, the respective actresses, Trisha and Nayanthara had to provide a No Objection Certificate, permitting the team to register the title. The title was an amendment of Vadivelu's dialogue "trisha illana divya" ( If Not Trisha, Then Divya) from Thalai Nagaram (2006). Actresses Anandhi and Manisha Yadav were signed on to play the lead actresses. To prepare for his role, Prakash undertook a diet regime and sported a thick beard.

Simran was revealed to also be a part of the cast in February 2015, and made a comeback to Tamil films after a brief time. Priya Anand shot with the team in June 2015, making a guest appearance in the film. Arya also was selected by the team to portray another cameo role in the film.

Soundtrack

G. V. Prakash Kumar composed the songs while Kabilan, Rokesh and Na. Muthukumar wrote the lyrics. Sony Music released the album on 4 June 2015.

Release
The film's distribution rights were bought by Studio Green in May 2015, who purchased the film after being impressed with the teaser. The official trailer of the film was released on 6 July 2015. While the film was given an "A" (adults only) certificate by the Central Board of Film Certification, it received a 12A rating from British Board of Film Classification, which allowed viewers under 18 years of age to watch it. It released worldwide on 17 September 2015.

Critical reception
Baradwaj Rangan wrote, "Where the director really chickens out is in not pushing his 'A' rating far enough. At a time when films claim they are made for 'family audiences' despite having the worst innuendos, here's someone being honest — he's saying his film is strictly for adults. But why, then, waste so much time on songs and a soggy romantic subplot...? After all, you've pretty much torched Thamizh kalaacharam with your heroines — why not gross us out all the way? But I wouldn't write Adhik Ravichandran off. He has a good ear for laugh-out-loud dialogue and a good eye for the absurd." Similarly, Indo-Asian News Service wrote, "Trisha Illana Nayanthara was promoted as the boldest Tamil film of this generation, and as strictly intended for adults. It's bold to an extent, but not quite enough and that's disappointing, considering it was Tamil cinema's first attempt at the genre and I wish they had gone all the way" and that "Adhik is a filmmaker you can't easily write off." The Times of India gave 3 stars out of 5 and wrote, "There are innumerable innuendos...and adult comedy...and misogynist dialogues, but they do not come across as exploitative but rather harmless fun. And the film also has moments of genuine absurdity...that prove us that the director clearly knows what he is doing." Sify wrote, "Trisha Illana Nayanthara is uninhibited and naughty which has enough frenzied moments to keep the youth audiences in splits." Rediff gave 2 stars out of 5 and wrote, "Director Adhik Ravichandran's Trisha Illana Nayanthara is no sensitive coming-of-age film, but rather a prejudiced portrayal of modern day youngsters discovering their sexuality."

References

External links

2015 films
2010s sex comedy films
Films scored by G. V. Prakash Kumar
Films about virginity
Indian coming-of-age comedy films
2010s Tamil-language films
Indian sex comedy films
2015 directorial debut films
2015 comedy films
2010s coming-of-age comedy films